Digte (English: "Poems") is a collection of poetry by Henrik Ibsen, published on 3 May 1871. It included poems written between 1847 and 1870, the best known being the poem "Terje Vigen".

An extended edition was published in December 1875, including four other poems.

External links
Runeberg.org Original edition

References

Works by Henrik Ibsen
Poetry collections